The 1896 North Carolina A&M Aggies football team represented the North Carolina A&M Aggies of North Carolina College of Agriculture and Mechanic Arts during the 1896 college football season. They played a single game, against , winning 6–0.

Schedule

References

North Carolina AandM
NC State Wolfpack football seasons
College football undefeated seasons
North Carolina AandM Aggies football